Tegostoma is a genus of moths of the family Crambidae.

Species

References

Natural History Museum Lepidoptera genus database

Odontiini
Crambidae genera
Taxa named by Philipp Christoph Zeller
Taxa described in 1874